The CrimsonRide is an area bus service serving the students, staff, faculty, and general public on and around the University of Alabama's campus in Tuscaloosa, Alabama. The CrimsonRide is operated by First Transit, under  contract with UA's Department of Transportation Services, and commenced operation on August 11, 2007. The CrimsonRide replaced the previous Blue & Yellow Routes operated by the Tuscaloosa Transit Authority as the public transit option for students, staff, faculty, and general public on the UA campus.

The buses run as early as 7 a.m. until as late as 4 a.m. with 15 being used at peak hours and 8 being used at non-peak times. The buses run at 5-minute intervals on the academic routes in the central portion of campus and at 20-minute intervals on the perimeter of the campus. Each bus is also equipped with a TransLoc GPS monitor allowing for the status of each bus to be monitored by users in real time.

History
The development of an on-campus shuttle system was initially offered as a serious proposal in  Fall 2005 with an initial opening date set in August 2006, but by Winter 2006, university officials announced the system would be operational by August 2007. In June 2006, the UA Board of Trustees approved the budget of $1.8 million for the proposed transit system. The funding for the system project was paid with a $1.5 million federal transportation appropriations grant and supplemented with an additional $375,000 generated from parking fees.

Paying tribute to the Crimson Tide nickname, the moniker CrimsonRide was selected by students voting in the 2006 Homecoming elections over the second place name of Tide Transit. With the start of the bus system, several roads throughout campus were closed to vehicular traffic in becoming solely bus and bicycle lanes. The most notable of the road closures are located around the Quad. The system would open in June 2007 in a test mode, with the official opening occurring on August 11, 2007.

After its first semester in operation, the system saw an average ridership of 13,510 passengers per day. The CrimsonRide served its 2 millionth passenger, Ciara Prater, at the beginning of its second year of service on August 25, 2008.

Routes

The CrimsonRide operates eight routes during the weekdays and a singular, comprehensive system on the weekends. The four weekday routes are listed below:
 Crimson - Serves the central portion of campus around the Quad, sorority row and the south campus residence halls. pdf map
Crimson Stops
 "Transit Hub"
 "Amelia Gayle Gorgas Library"
 "Bidgood Hall"
 "East Stadium"
 "Tutwiller Hall"
 "Mary Burke Hall"
 "Farrah Hall"
 "Lloyd Hall"
 Blue 1 - Serves the eastern portion of campus around fraternity row, the campus recreation center and the east campus residence halls. pdf map
Blue 1 Stops
 "Transit Hub"
 "Aquatic Center"
 "University Recreation Center"
 "Student Health Center"
 "Soccer Lot"
 "Bryant Hall"
 Blue Express - Mostly covers the east portion of campus, along with part of the Quad.
Blue Express Stops
 "Transit Hub"
 "Amelia Gayle Gorgas Library
 "Bidgood Hall"
 "Rose Administration"
 "Farrah Hall"
 "Moody Music"
 "Soccer Lot"
 "Student Health Center"
 "Child Development Center"
 "Tennis Courts/Softball Complex"
 "Aquatic Center"
 Gold Route - Serves the northwestern portion of campus around the west campus academic buildings, the north campus residence halls. This route is divided into Gold 1 and Gold 2. pdf map
Gold 1 Stops
 "Transit Hub"
 "Amelia Gayle Gorgas Library"
 "Bidgood Hall"
 "Presidential Apartments"
 "Publix"
 "Ferguson Center"
 "H. M. Comer Hall"
 "AIME Building"
 "Rose Towers/Riverside"
 "Shelby Hall"
Gold 2 Stops
 "Transit Hub"
 "Shelby Hall"
 "Highlands"
 "Presidential Village”
 "Ferguson Parking Deck"
 "Ridgecrest Residential"
 "Publix"
 "UPS"
 "Friedman Hall"
 "Rose Administration"
 "Lloyd Hall"
 Green Route - This route is divided between Green 1 and Green 2. Green 1 serves the north and west portions of campus. Green 2 serves the south part of campus. pdf map
Green 1 Stops
 "Amelia Gayle Gorgas Library"
 "Bidgood Hall"
 "Ten Hoor Hall"
 "Ridgecrest"
 "Publix"
 "West Stadium/Wallace Wade"
 "Rose Administration"
 "Lloyd Hall"
Green 2 Stops
 "Transit Hub"
 "Amelia Gayle Gorgas Library"
 "Bidgood Hall"
 "East Stadium"
 "Tutwiler"
 "Mary Burke Hall"
 "Sewell-Thomas Stadium"
 "Coliseum Parking Lot"
 "Moody Music Building"
 "Bryce Lawn"
 Coleman-Quad Express - Serves the large southeast commuter parking lots, by directly connecting the area surrounding Coleman Coliseum on the southeast edge of campus, to the Quad in the heart of the campus.
Coleman-Quad Stops
 "Amelia Gayle Gorgas Library"
 "Bidgood Hall"
 "Tutwiler"
 "Sewell-Thomas Stadium"
 "Coliseum Parking Lot"
 "Moody Music Building"
 "Lloyd Hall"
 "Perimeter Route" - Separated into North and South routes, the perimeter buses run on nights and weekends, stopping at various places across campus.
Perimeter North Stops
 "Transit Hub"
 "Rose Towers/Riverside"
 "Lakeside Residential"
 "Paty/Lakeside Dining"
 "Ferguson Parking Deck"
 "Ridgecrest"
 "Publix"
 "Rose Administration"
 "Lloyd Hall"
 "Amelia Gayle Gorgas Library"
 "Bidgood Hall"
 "East Stadium"
 "Tutwiler"
 "Mary Burke Hall"
 "Moody Music Building"
 "Soccer Lot"
 "Student Health Center"
 "Student Recreation Center"
 "Aquatic Center"
Perimeter South Stops
 "Transit Hub"
 "Aquatic Center"
 "Student Recreation Center"
 "Student Health Center
 "Soccer Lot"
 "Moody Music Building"
 "Bryant Museum"
 "Mary Burke Hall"
 Tutwiler/Sorority Row"
 "West Stadium"
 "Presidential Apartments"
 "Publix"
 "Ferguson Center"
 "H.M. Comer Hall"
 "AIME Building"
 "Rose Towers/Riverside"
 "Shelby Hall"
 "348-RIDE" -In operation when the perimeter and regular routes are not running, this free service to students allows students to call in a van to pick them up and drop them off anywhere on campus and in the direct vicinity surrounding campus.
 "348-RIDE Express"-3 busses operate between 9pm and 3am Thursday thru Saturday to serve the major portions of campus during the weekend.

References 

2007 establishments in Alabama
Bus transportation in Alabama
University and college bus systems
University of Alabama
Transportation in Tuscaloosa, Alabama